Lindavista is a metro station along Line 6 of the Mexico City Metro. It is located in the Gustavo A. Madero borough. In 2019, the station had an average ridership of 17,878 passengers per day.

Name and pictogram
The station is located and primarily serves the Lindavista neighborhood, a middle-class residential zone in the Gustavo A. Madero borough in northern Mexico City. Therefore, the station drew its name from the neighborhood. Its pictogram depicts the silhouette of the nearby Saint Cajetan church, which, itself, is another symbol of Lindavista.

General information
Lindavista opened on 8 July 1986 as part of the second and final stretch of Line 6, going from Instituto del Petróleo to Martín Carrera, the line's current eastern terminus.

El muro de los lamentos, a mural by Daniel Kent can be found within the station.

Ridership

Gallery

References

External links 

Lindavista
Mexico City Metro stations in Gustavo A. Madero, Mexico City
Railway stations opened in 1986
1986 establishments in Mexico
Accessible Mexico City Metro stations